Circaea canadensis, known as eastern enchanter's nightshade, Canada enchanter's nightshade, broad-leaved enchanter's nightshade, is a perennial herbaceous plant found in forests of eastern North America. It is very similar to its sister species, Circaea lutetiana, and was formerly considered conspecific (part of the same species).

References

canadensis
Flora of North America